Skullgirls is a 2D fighting game developed by Reverge Labs and published by Autumn Games. In Skullgirls, players fight each other with teams of one, two, or three characters, attempting to knock out their opponents or have the most cumulative health when time runs out. The setting of the game revolves around the "Skull Heart", an artifact which grants wishes for women. If a wisher with an impure soul uses the Skull Heart, she is transformed into a monster known as the "Skullgirl". The game was first released through the PlayStation Network and Xbox Live Arcade in April 2012, and received generally positive reviews from critics, who praised the animation and gameplay mechanics, while criticizing its initial roster size and online multiplayer features.

Development of post-release content faced numerous setbacks. In May 2012, publisher Autumn Games was sued over allegations of fraud regarding an unrelated property, Def Jam Rapstar, cutting off Skullgirls financial support and forcing developer Reverge Labs to lay off the entire development team. The core team would eventually reform as Lab Zero Games in November 2012, launching a successful crowdfunding campaign to raise funds to continue their work. This allowed Lab Zero Games to develop the Windows version, which was released by Marvelous in August 2013.

After Autumn Games severed ties with distributor Konami in December 2013, the latter formally requested to have the game removed from the PlayStation and Xbox storefronts. The game was later re-released on both platforms in 2014 as Skullgirls Encore. When the game was ported to PlayStation 4 and PC in 2015, it was renamed to Skullgirls 2nd Encore. This version was later released for Japanese arcades in October 2015, for PlayStation Vita in April 2016, for Nintendo Switch in October 2019, and is planned for Xbox One and Xbox Series X/S in 2023. A spin-off title, Skullgirls Mobile, was developed by Hidden Variable Studios and released for Android and iOS devices in May 2017. Originally published by Line, it is currently supported by Autumn Games alongside the main game.

In August 2020, Autumn Games and Hidden Variable Studios severed ties with Lab Zero Games after sexual harassment allegations were raised against lead designer and programmer Mike Zaimont. Following the dissolution of Lab Zero Games, several former members founded another independent game studio, Future Club, which collaborated with Hidden Variable Studios on future content for 2nd Encore.

Gameplay

The engine and playstyle for Skullgirls were intentionally modeled after Marvel vs. Capcom 2: New Age of Heroes, incorporating several similar game mechanics such as tag team-based combat, character assists, snapbacks, and delayed hyper combos. The game can be played using different ratios of characters (similarly to Capcom vs. SNK 2: Mark of the Millennium 2001), with each player able to select up to three fighters on their team. The teams are then balanced based on the number of team members. A single character possesses more health and deals more damage, while larger teams gain the ability to perform character assists and recover health when tagged out. Players can also customize their character assist attacks.

The game includes a story mode, arcade mode, versus mode, training room, tutorial mode, and online play using the GGPO networking library. Skullgirls includes various unique features to address system and balance problems, such as infinite combo detection. When the game detects a looping combo through monitoring the players' attacks, the other player can break free of the infinite by hitting any button. In addition, Skullgirls offers protection against "unblockable attacks", which occur when a player, for example, uses a low-hitting move and a high-hitting assist attack at the same time, making it nearly impossible for the opponent to block. The game attempts to remedy the issue by offering a brief period of unblockable protection after successfully blocking any attack.

At release, Skullgirls Encore saw  numerous gameplay adjustments and additions, including character balance tweaks, faster gameplay, an online training mode, and a stun meter designed to limit lengthy combos without compromising creativity. A new local game mode called "Typing of the Skullgirls", a mode inspired by games like The Typing of the Dead, was also added. When enabled, teams automatically generate meter and all attacks deal negligible damage. Super moves give typing prompts to the player, awarding damage for typing accuracy. In addition to fully voiced story modes and cross-platform play across the entire PlayStation family, Skullgirls 2nd Encore introduced challenges, where players fight against opponents under unique battle conditions; trials, which test players' skills by having them perform combos; and survival mode, which pits players against endless waves of enemies. The mobile version of Skullgirls incorporates RPG-like progression, customization, and deck-building mechanics.

Setting
Skullgirls takes place in the fictional Canopy Kingdom, a country reminiscent of 1940s post-war America, which is ruled by the Renoir royal family and plagued by the Medici mafia. The kingdom is populated by humans, anthropomorphic animals, giants, and other species. Magical items, creatures, and entities exist that grant their users and hosts various superhuman abilities, such as "Parasites" and "Living Weapons". A large part of the kingdom follows the religion of the Trinity, a trio of extraterrestrial goddesses consisting of Venus, Aeon, and their mysterious Mother. Numerous individuals and organizations seek to obtain the Skull Heart, a sentient artifact with reality-warping powers created by the Trinity. The Skull Heart appears once every seven years and grants a woman a single wish. If the woman's wish is impure, she is transformed into an undead monster known as the Skullgirl. The Skullgirl and Skull Heart are devices used by the Trinity to wreak havoc on the world. Humanity has fought against many Skullgirls over the course of history, establishing agencies to confront them, the most notable of which is Canopy Kingdom's Anti-Skullgirl Labs, a black-ops research institution spearheaded by the scientist Brain Drain.

During the Grand War, a battle fought between the Canopy Kingdom and two neighboring nations, Queen Nancy Renoir nearly brought the world to ruin when she attempted to use the Skull Heart for the sake of peace. The three countries formed an alliance to bring down the Skullgirl, signing a peace treaty thereafter. Seven years later, a slave girl named Marie Korbel has emerged as the newest Skullgirl and begun to terrorize the Canopy Kingdom to exact revenge against the Medici. The game's story mode follows several fighters and their journeys to confront Marie and claim the Skull Heart. Each fighter has their own motive for seeking the Skull Heart, whether to destroy it or use its power for their own interests.

Characters
The base Skullgirls roster consists of eight playable characters:
 Filia, an amnesiac schoolgirl with a powerful hair-like Parasite companion named Samson.
 Cerebella, a circus performer, enforcer for the Medici mafia, and wielder of the hat-like Living Weapon Vice-Versa.
 Peacock, a hyperactive, cartoonish Anti-Skullgirl cyborg who can distort reality.
 Parasoul, the Renoir princess and first daughter of Queen Nancy, who wields the umbrella-shaped Living Weapon Krieg.
 Ms. Fortune, a seemingly-immortal cat burglar who can separate and control her body parts.
 Painwheel, a subservient Anti-Skullgirl cyborg who fights using a pinwheel of blades attached to her back.
 Valentine, a former Anti-Skullgirl Labs operative and nurse-turned-Skullgirl ally, who uses medical equipment as weapons.
 Double, a shapeshifting demon who is a servant of the Trinity and protector of the Skull Heart.

Following the conclusion of the game's Indiegogo crowdfunding campaign in 2013, an additional five downloadable characters were developed:
 Squigly, a resurrected zombie opera singer who fights alongside her serpentine Parasite partner Leviathan. 
 Big Band, an Anti-Skullgirl cyborg and former police officer who uses musical instruments as weapons.
 Eliza, a famous singer who uses the ancient Parasite Sekhmet to manipulate blood and stay eternally young.
 Beowulf, a washed-up professional wrestler who fights with a chair and a giant's severed arm.
 Robo-Fortune, a non-canonical Anti-Skullgirl android who was modeled after Ms. Fortune by Brain Drain.

Along with the five aforementioned characters, the developers also added an extra fighter in a free update: Fukua, a non-canonical clone of Filia made by Brain Drain. Fukua was added to the game temporarily as an April Fools' joke in 2014, but was kept in response to fan feedback. All six characters are included in the base roster of Skullgirls 2nd Encore. 

Beginning in 2021 through 2023, four more playable fighters were announced and released as part of the Season 1 Pass:
 Annie, an unaging Skullgirl slayer and television personality who fights with cosmic power and her rabbit Parasite Sagan. 
 Umbrella, the younger sister of Parasoul who wields the umbrella-shaped Living Weapon Hungern to control the dormant Skullgirl power she inherited from her mother.
 Black Dahlia, a defected Anti-Skullgirl Labs member and current top enforcer of the Medici.
 Marie''', the current Skullgirl who can raise and control the dead. She serves as the boss of the game's story mode.

DevelopmentSkullgirls was originally conceived as several stray character designs that illustrator Alex "o_8" Ahad had been creating since high school. While attending college, Ahad had the hypothetical idea to use the character concepts for a fighting game roster. The idea would later become a reality when Ahad was introduced to fighting game enthusiast and tournament-goer Mike "Mike Z" Zaimont, who had been working on a fighting game engine during his own spare time. Early work on their new Skullgirls project began in 2008. Engine development and pre-production began in 2009. Ahad drew the art style and character designs based on a wide variety of his influences and inspirations, such as the works of Mike Mignola and Bruce Timm, Gainax's FLCL, Tex Avery's Red Hot Riding Hood, Capcom's Darkstalkers, and artists George Kamitani and Daisuke Ishiwatari. Ahad and Zaimont pitched Skullgirls to several companies, eventually teaming up with recently founded independent developer Reverge Labs in 2010. They later went on to sign with publisher Autumn Games. In April 2011, Reverge Labs licensed OtterUI as its user interface solution for the development of Skullgirls. At the Electronic Entertainment Expo 2011, Japanese developer and publisher Konami announced that they would help distribute the game.

Following the game's release, the Skullgirls team began teasing future content for the game, including new voice packs, color palettes, and downloadable characters. However, shortly thereafter, Autumn Games was hit with a series of lawsuits regarding Def Jam Rapstar, which "gummed up everything related to Autumn's funding." The entire Skullgirls development team was laid off by Reverge Labs in June 2012 after Autumn Games and Reverge Labs allowed their contract to expire without agreeing upon a new one. This prompted the team to reform under a new moniker, Lab Zero Games, to continue work on the PC release and downloadable content. Autumn Games, revealed to be in full possession of the IP, claimed it was "fully behind the new studio" and promised to "continue to work with [Lab Zero Games] in the future on all Skullgirls-related endeavors."

From January through February 2013, fighting game website Shoryuken hosted a charity donation drive to determine the final game to be featured in the 2013 Evolution Championship Series' tournament lineup, with all proceeds sent to the Breast Cancer Research Foundation. Melee, which raised over $94,000. Although the game did not win, Shoryuken announced that EVO 2013 event organizers would support the Skullgirls side tournament by providing prize money and exhibition support due to their effort in the fundraiser.

Crowdfunding and publisher transition
Despite Autumn Games' support and desire to expand Skullgirls, their continued litigation prevented the publisher from providing any financial backing. Attempting to pick up where they left off, Lab Zero Games decided to ask its fanbase for help once more, following the success of the EVO 2013 charity drive. On February 25, 2013, Lab Zero Games set up an Indiegogo page for Skullgirls, in an effort to raise $150,000 for the development of the game's first DLC character, Squigly. Contributors received various rewards, including desktop wallpapers, a digital copy of the official soundtrack, Steam keys for the PC release, Steam keys for Half-Minute Hero, and the chance to add a background character to the game, among others. The campaign reached its initial goal in less than 24 hours, while the stretch goal of a second DLC character, Big Band, secured funding in just over 2 weeks. A third DLC character, determined by fan vote, was funded during the final two days, along with a playable robotic version of Ms. Fortune named Robo-Fortune. An additional stretch goal that would provide a free license for the game's engine, Z-Engine, to the developers of Them's Fightin' Herds (at the time called Fighting is Magic) was also funded. With minutes left before the end of the drive, the last stretch goal was met, securing funding for another fan-selected DLC character. The Indiegogo campaign raised nearly $830,000 of its original $150,000 goal. Several alternate character and announcer voice packs were also funded. All downloadable characters and voice packs were free to download on all platforms within the first three months of their release.

On November 7, 2013, Lab Zero Games announced that Autumn Games had severed ties with Konami, citing Konami's unresponsiveness as a major hurdle to the release of further console patches. Following the dissolution of the partnership, Konami requested the removal of Skullgirls from the PlayStation Network and Xbox Live Arcade by the end of 2013. In response, Lab Zero Games announced on December 17, 2013, that Skullgirls would be re-released on consoles as Skullgirls Encore, a new build including up-to-date changes and additions, in January 2014. Encore marked the transition of the console versions to its new publishers, Marvelous and CyberFront, and coincided with the console releases of Squigly and the "Character Color Bundle" DLC. While Encore was released as a title update for the Xbox 360 version, the PlayStation 3 version required owners to re-download the game at no cost; leaderboard rankings, save data, and trophies were not carried over. The PC version was later patched to reflect the new title.

Staff resignations and developer transition
In June 2020, multiple allegations of misconduct were made against lead designer and programmer Mike Zaimont. Two individuals claimed that Zaimont had made inappropriate sexual comments towards them, which triggered an internal investigation of Zaimont's behavior within Lab Zero Games. A decision was reached by Lab Zero Games' board to request Zaimont's resignation. According to senior art producer Brian Jun, Zaimont refused to resign unless a series of demands were met, which Jun deemed "unrealistically high and potentially illegal". Zaimont's demands were rejected by the board. In response, Zaimont disbanded the board and assumed sole ownership of Lab Zero Games. Senior animator Jonathan Kim claimed that Zaimont delivered an ultimatum wherein he gave all unsatisfied employees until August 31 to leave the company. In late August, Kim, Jun, and lead animator Mariel Cartwright resigned from Lab Zero Games and individually issued statements denouncing Zaimont's actions.

Within a day of the series of resignations, Hidden Variable Studios and Autumn Games severed their ties with Mike Zaimont and Lab Zero Games in a joint statement. In the statement, both parties expressed intent to work with the employees who resigned from Lab Zero Games on the continued development of Skullgirls. Shortly after the resignations, Zaimont retaliated by firing the rest of the staff, leaving him the sole employee and owner of Lab Zero Games. Cartwright raised money for the staff, who had been fired without severance, by selling her sketchbooks. Additional inappropriate interactions with the community came to light after the resignations. Several former Lab Zero Games members, including Cartwright and Kim, then went on to establish a new cooperatively-structured independent game studio called Future Club.

In February 2021, Autumn Games revealed the development of the Season 1 Pass, which included four DLC characters, a digital artbook, and an updated soundtrack. The publisher also teased the possibility of a fifth DLC fighter, along with other free content, depending on the success of the season pass. In March 2021, Future Club formally announced their collaboration with Hidden Variable Studios in developing 2nd Encores DLC content.

Soundtrack

The Skullgirls Original Soundtrack consists of 28 original compositions. The album features music by Michiru Yamane, Vincent Diamante, Blaine McGurty, and Brenton Kossak. The soundtrack was released on April 24, 2012, on iTunes. People who donated at least $10 to the Skullgirls Indiegogo crowdfunding campaign received a digital copy of the soundtrack. An exclusive, physical CD release of the Skullgirls Original Soundtrack was offered, among other rewards, to those who donated $150 or more to the drive.

On April 20, 2011, Reverge Labs officially announced that they had enlisted Yamane, primarily known for her work on Konami's Castlevania series, to help create the soundtrack for Skullgirls. According to Richard Wyckoff, CEO of Reverge Labs, the developers sought out Yamane because "[they] knew her mixture of haunting gothic themes, jazz and rock would lend itself perfectly to Skullgirls' 'Dark Deco' style." When Reverge Labs requested Yamane to write "jazzy" music, she "played a bit with the rhythm and different sounds to try and heighten the impact and almost primal nature of the unique graphics."

ReleaseSkullgirls was released on the PlayStation Network in North America on April 10, 2012, and the Xbox Live Arcade on April 11, 2012. Europe and Australia later received the PlayStation Network version on May 2, 2012. The game was released in Japan by CyberFront on the PlayStation Network on February 14, 2013, and was also brought to Japanese arcades through the NESiCAxLive digital distribution system by game developer M2. The public beta test for the Microsoft Windows version of Skullgirls began on July 4, 2013. The official Microsoft Windows version was released by Marvelous on August 22, 2013.Skullgirls Encore launched on the PlayStation Network in North America on February 11, 2014, and Europe on March 19, 2014. The Xbox Live Arcade version of Skullgirls received an update for Encore on April 22, 2014.

On July 10, 2014, Lab Zero Games announced that Skullgirls Encore would be released on PlayStation 4 and PlayStation Vita sometime in 2014. This port, later titled Skullgirls 2nd Encore, would eventually be delayed until 2015. 2nd Encore was released for PlayStation 4 on July 7, 2015, in North America, and July 23, 2015, in Europe. PlayStation Vita would only receive the game on April 5, 2016, in North America and April 14, 2016, in Europe. On April 14, 2016 2nd Encore was also published for both platforms in Japan by Arc System Works. In North America, Hidden Variable Studios and Limited Run Games produced a limited physical edition of 2nd Encore, which included a disc-based copy of the game, a slip cover, a full-color instruction manual, and a special selection soundtrack.

Back in May 2013, when Lab Zero Games was asked on their official Twitter account about a potential release for Nintendo's Wii U console, the developer replied that while it was possible, it "[wasn't] looking likely", citing the console's low sales and not having an established "digital presence" at the time. During Anime Expo in July 2018, Lab Zero Games confirmed that a port of Skullgirls 2nd Encore was in development for its successor, Nintendo Switch. The Nintendo Switch release would include all content, and be available both physically and digitally. In February 2019, Lab Zero Games announced that the Nintendo Switch port of Skullgirls 2nd Encore would be released the following month, and that an Xbox One port would be released at the same time, courtesy of Skybound Games. However, despite this announcement, the game was eventually released for the Nintendo Switch on October 22 of that year, whilst the Xbox One version was "postponed indefinitely due to unforeseen development and production challenges". In May 2022, it was announced that the Xbox One and Xbox Series X and Series S versions are in development, now targeting the 2022 release window until it was delayed to 2023.

Skullgirls Mobile
The free-to-play spin-off for Android and iOS, titled Skullgirls Mobile, was released on May 25, 2017, in North America, South America, Europe, Australia, New Zealand, and the Philippines. It was developed by Hidden Variable Studios and published by Line Corporation, creators of the Line communications app. Eventually, Line Corporation has decided to part ways with the project, with Autumn Games taking over the publishing duties. As such, the old version of the game, preemptively renamed LINE Skullgirls, was removed from all storefronts on January 15, 2018. A new version, sometimes called Skullgirls 2.0 by the developer, was released on January 18, 2018, and allowed existing players to carry over their progress. As a result of the move, the developer has promised more transparency over the game's microtransactions, namely in its gacha rates, as well as more consistent release of new content. Currently, Skullgirls Mobile is supported alongside 2nd Encore, and shares many of its updates.

Reception
Critical responseSkullgirls received "generally positive" reviews, according to video game review aggregator Metacritic.

Several reviewers praised the presentation and animation. Ryan Clements of IGN praised the graphics, claiming that the game created "some of the best hand-drawn character sprites ever used in gaming." Clements also gave the game an Editor's Choice award. John Learned of GamesRadar also praised the art style, stating that the art deco design gave playable characters and backgrounds added flair. However, some reviewers criticized the art style and overtly sexualized all-female cast, including accusations of sexism. Dan Ryckert of Game Informer stated that while Skullgirls was beautifully animated, some animations were "juvenile and unnecessary". Ryckert expressed disappointment with the artistic focus on "anatomy and fetishistic outfits."

Reviewers also praised the gameplay and system mechanics. Maxwell McGee of GameSpot credited the ability to adjust team sizes, adding that the trade-off between strength and versatility helped to accommodate a wider skill range of players. Neidel Crisan of 1UP praised the tutorial system for teaching beginner players about the fundamentals of the fighting game genre. Daniel Maniago of G4 complimented the custom assists, anti-infinite system, and online play, praising Reverge Labs for utilizing feedback from the fighting game community during development.Skullgirls received its share of criticism. IGN's Ryan Clements criticized the small selection of gameplay modes, missing character move lists, and overly aggressive AI. GameTrailers criticized the limited roster size, stating that the tag-based battling felt underdeveloped as a result. Simon Parkin of Eurogamer pointed out the lack of online features, such as a spectator mode, replays, and endless lobbies. Jordan Mallory of Joystiq reprimanded the game for its "goofy and immature" premise, sexualized art style, and unoriginal character movesets. Mallory concluded that the series would have been better off spending another year in development.Skullgirls received Best Fighting Game nominations from IGN, 1UP, and the Official E3 Game Critics Awards. The game was nominated for 2012 Best Animated Video Game at the 40th Annual Annie Awards. Skullgirls was also recognized in the 2013 Guinness World Records Gamer's Edition for the most frames of animation per character, reaching 11,515 total frames for its initial eight characters and averaging 1,439 frames per fighter. In 2017, Skullgirls 2nd Encore was listed in Game Informer's list of "The 10 Most Underrated Games Of This Generation".

SalesSkullgirls sold over 50,000 copies across both platforms within ten days, becoming the highest selling game on the Xbox Live Arcade upon its release and third best-selling title on PlayStation Network for April 2012. The game saw a similar performance in Japan, climbing to the top of PSN's list of best-selling downloadable PlayStation 3 titles within a week. According to Peter Bartholow, CEO of Lab Zero Games, Skullgirls met Japanese publisher CyberFront's lifetime sales expectations in the first two weeks of release. The PS4 version entered the Japanese charts at #17. On September 4, 2017, Zaimont announced that Skullgirls had sold one million copies on Steam.

Legacy
At the 2019 Anime Expo, a webcomic series published by Webtoon was announced. The webcomic, written by Mike Exner III and illustrated by Wiirdo/Pasteldot and Artist Black/Suzi Blake, began publishing weekly on November 19, 2022. Skullgirls'' made its debut as a main lineup game at EVO 2022, over a decade after its original release.

References
Notes

Footnotes

External links

2012 video games
2D fighting games
Crowdfunded video games
Fighting games
Fighting games used at the Evolution Championship Series tournament
Indie video games
Indiegogo projects
Konami games
Linux games
MacOS games
Multiplayer and single-player video games
NESiCAxLive games
Nintendo Switch games
PlayStation 3 games
PlayStation 4 games
PlayStation Network games
PlayStation Vita games
Tag team videogames
Video games about ninja
Video games adapted into comics
Video games developed in the United States
Video games scored by Michiru Yamane
Video games with cross-platform play
Video games with downloadable content
Webtoons
Windows games
Xbox 360 Live Arcade games
Xbox One games
Xbox Series X and Series S games
CyberFront games